EAEC may refer to:

 European American Evangelistic Crusades, a Christian mission organization based in the United States of America.
 European Automobile Engineers Cooperation, part of the Fédération Internationale des Sociétés d'Ingénieurs des Techniques de l'Automobile
 East African Examinations Council
 East Asia Economic Caucus, a regional free trade zone proposed in 1990
 Enteroaggregative Escherichia coli, a virulence property of Escherichia coli
 Eurasian Economic Community
 Edge Analytics and Edge Computing, see Edge Computing
 European Atomic Energy Community (Euratom) an international organisation which is legally distinct from the European Union, but has the same membership